Eyralpenus is a genus of tiger moths in the family Erebidae. The genus was erected by Arthur Gardiner Butler in 1875. The moths in the genus are found in the Afrotropics.

Species 
 Eyralpenus inconspicua (Rothschild, 1910)
 Eyralpenus kovtunovitchi Dubatolov, 2011
 Eyralpenus postflavida (Rothschild, 1933)
 Eyralpenus scioana (Oberthür, 1879 [1880])
 Eyralpenus scioana intensa (Rothschild, 1910)
 Eyralpenus scioana paucipunctata (Kiriakoff, 1963)
 Eyralpenus sublutea (Bartel, 1903)
 Eyralpenus testacea (Walker, 1855)
 Eyralpenus trifasciata (Holland, 1892)

Subgenus Pareyralpenus Dubatolov & Haynes, 2008 
 Eyralpenus diplosticta (Hampson, 1900)
 Eyralpenus meinhofi (Bartel, 1903)
 Eyralpenus quadrilunata (Hampson, 1901)

References

 , 2009: Reviewing the African tiger-moth genera: 1. A new genus, two new subgenera and a species list from the expedition to Malawi by V.Kovtunovich & P. Usthjuzhanin in 2008–2009, with further taxonomic notes on South African Arctiinae (Lepidoptera, Arctiidae: Arctiinae). Atalanta 40 (1/2): 285–301, 352-355 (colour plates 24-27).
 , 2011: Arctiinae from African expeditions of V. Kovtunovich & P. Ustjuzhanin in 2009–2011, with description of new taxa and taxonomic notes (Lepidoptera, Arctiidae). Atalanta 42 (1/2): 125–135.
 , 2008: Reviewing the African tiger-moth genera. 1. New genera from the late Prof. V. S. Murzin's collection (Lepidoptera, Arctiidae). Atalanta 39 (1/4): 356–366, 20 figs., pl. 15.

Spilosomina